Secrets of Sex, also known as Bizarre, is a 1970 British multi-genre sexploitation anthology film directed by Antony Balch, an experimental filmmaker and frequent collaborator with William S. Burroughs. The film is narrated by an Egyptian mummy (voiced by Valentine Dyall).

Plot
Each segment, all featuring recurring themes of sex, is introduced by an Egyptian Mummy portrayed by Valentine Dyall.

Cast
 Valentine Dyall as The Mummy
 Richard Schulman as The Judge
 Janet Spearman as The Judge's Wife
 Dorothy Grumbar as The Photographer
 Anthony Rowlands as The Model
 Norma Eden as The Photographer's Assistant
 George Herbert as The Steward
 Kenneth Benda as Sacha Seremona
 Yvonne Quenet as Mary-Clare
 Reid Anderson as Dr. Rilke
 Sylvia Delamere as The Nurse
 Cathy Howard as The Cat Burglar
 Mike Briton as The Burgled Man
 Maria Frost as Lindy Leigh
 Peter Carlisle as Colonel X
 Steve Preston as Philpott
 Graham Burrows as The Military Attache
 Mike Patten as 1st Flicker Flashback Boy
 Raymond George as 2nd Flicker Flashback Boy
 Karrie Lambert as 1st Flicker Flashback Lady
 Joyce Leigh Crossley as 2nd Flicker Flashback Lady
 Nicola Austine as The Flicker Flashback Girl
 Elliott Stein as The Strange Young Man
 Sue Bond as The Call Girl
 Laurelle Streeter as The Lady in the Greenhouse
 Bob E. Raymond as The Lady in the Greenhouse's New Valet

Production
The dinosaur sculptures that feature in the “Strange Young Man” segment are the famous Crystal Palace Dinosaurs.

Development
After directing the Burroughs-influenced shorts "Towers Open Fire" (1963) and "The Cut Ups" (1967), Balch approached producer Richard Gordon in 1968 to direct an anthology film running just over an hour and entitled Multiplication.

Writing
Five writers are credited with the screenplay; several others, including Brion Gysin and Ian Cullen (writer of Cruel Passion (1977) and husband to Yvonne Quenet, who plays Mary-Claire in the film) also claimed to have worked on the script.

Filming
After the script was rewritten to bring the film up to feature length and the budget doubled (32,000 pounds) filming took place over 14 weeks in 1969.

Casting
Many of the actresses who appear nude in the film, such as Nicole Austin and Maria Frost, were topless models who had begun to get minor acting roles in British sex and horror films of the period. Frost, who plays Lindy Leigh in the film, was so horrified she'd been given a major role in the film that she reportedly told Balch “I’m a model, I can't act.” She had previously appeared in the two Harrison Marks shorts "Maria" and "Scouts Honour".

Release
Released in February 1970, it was a huge success in the UK, running for six months at the Jacey Cinema in Piccadilly Circus alone, during which time it recouped its entire production cost. The film remained in circulation in the UK throughout the 1970s, sometimes appearing in a half hour edited version that played on the second half of double-bills.

Censorship history
The film was substantially cut for the British cinema release in 1970, with censor John Trevelyan removing over nine minutes from the film, while reportedly muttering “nasty stuff”. Heavily cut was the "Spanish horse/Female photographer" sequence, together with assorted orgy and lovemaking scenes, while shots of men in bed together in the "Bedroom Beauties of 1929" sequence were removed entirely. Writing in the Monthly Film Bulletin (March 1970) Jan Dawson remarked of the cuts: “paradoxically, the bowdlerized version of the film moves closer to pornography than the version from which its audience is being protected. …it's sad that censorship should function against its own long term purpose and re-enforce the man-in-the-mac’s sexual furtiveness by denying him the chance to view sex irreverently.” The film was briefly released uncut in America under the name Bizarre by New Line Cinema, before being withdrawn and re-released in 1972 as Tales of the Bizarre, a drastically re-edited version that deleted around 17 minutes from the film. The 1980 UK video release on the Iver Film Services label is uncut, as is the 2005 American DVD and the 2009 British DVD.

Critical response
 “[A]n exploitation sex film informed throughout by the refreshing view that sex is less often fun than funny.. (the stories) create a hilarious effect because of the discrepancy between their own unflinching seriousness and the ludicrousness of the pet theories they expound” – Monthly Film Bulletin
 “Flair, resource, and a splendid gothic dottiness” – The Guardian
 “Strange and personal, a genuine and appealing oddity” – The Times
 “Erotic” – Financial Times
 “It aims to shock” - Kine Weekly
 “Excellent” &ndash Today's Cinema “The sun just set on the British empire…you’ve never seen anything like it” – Screw MagazineDirector's response
Commenting on the film in an unpublished 1975 interview, Balch claimed “this is a very uneven film, but three episodes and a single shot, are good. I liked the ones with the photographer, Elliot Stein, and the Lady in the Greenhouse. The episode of the monster baby is a bore, but the single shot of it, at the end is brilliant.”

Home media
In 2005, the film was released as a special edition DVD by Synapse Films under its American title, Bizarre. In January 2010, the film, under its original title, was finally released on DVD in the UK by Odeon Entertainment, featuring new sleeve-notes by author Simon Sheridan.

References

Sources
Sheridan, Simon. Keeping the British End Up: Four Decades of Saucy Cinema'', Reynolds & Hearn Books (third edition, 2007)

External links
 

1969 films
British sex comedy films
1960s English-language films
1960s British films